Robert Gillies (31 July 1835 – 15 June 1886) was a 19th-century Member of Parliament in Otago, New Zealand. He was born in Rothesay on the Isle of Bute, Scotland.

He resigned in 1885 for failing health, which caused the 1885 Bruce by-election.

He died on 15 June 1886 from an aneurysm of the heart. He was the brother of Thomas Gillies and John Lillie Gillies, and the father of plastic surgeon Harold Gillies. Robert was buried in the Northern Cemetery.

Family 
He was one of the eight children (5 sons and 3 daughters) of Isabella (née Lillie) and John Gillies (born Rothesay on 22 April 1802). His father was a lawyer and a member of Otago Provincial Council. Robert spent a year at Glasgow University in 1851, but his father then decided to emigrate.

In 1866 Robert married, Emily Street, the daughter of his business partner. Charles Henry Street (1824-1887 Emily was a niece of Edward Lear, the nonsense writer and landscape painter. Emily, who had moved to Dunedin with her parents and grandparents when aged 5, was a founder of the first kindergarten in Dunedin, and took a keen interest in charitable works. After Robert's death in 1886, Emily moved her family from Dunedin to Auckland. 

By 1902, the children had grown up and she bought part of her mother's Birtley estate. In 1905, the wedding of Emily Sophia Gillies (their eldest daughter) and Robert Williams Michell was held at her new Parnell house, Kohanga. 

In November 1911, Emily Gillies sold Kohanga, following the death of her mother, Mrs Street, earlier that year. She moved into Birtley, the home she had inherited from her parents, where she remained until her death on 7 September 1913, aged 65. 

Emily and Robert had eight children: 
 Charles Stuart Gillies helped found the Auckland Golf Club in 1894, was a lawyer and golf champion and died of meningitis
 George John Gillies
 Robert Craig Gillies was a sheep farmer at Hakataramea
 Arthur William Gillies was elected mayor of Hāwera in 1912, started the development of Kawaha Point at Rotorua and became a stockbroker in Auckland
 Harry Thomas Gillies was Crown Prosecutor at Hamilton for 36 years from 1910
 Emily Sophia Michell was at Cambridge and a golf champion, who died in France
 Eleanor Lillie Bowen was at Parnell, a golf champion and worked with charities for the blind in Cape Town
 Dr Harold D Gillies

Business 
Robert worked on the family's Milton farm and helped form the Bruce Agricultural Society. Later he farmed at Awamoko, near Duntroon, where he bred Leicester sheep. From 1857 to 1860 he worked for Otago Provincial Surveying Department, being one of the first to discover gold on the banks of several streams. In 1861 he joined Charles Henry Street (1824-1887) as an estate agent. Walter Hislop replaced Charles Street in the partnership, the firm becoming 'Gillies, Street & Hislop'. In 1884 they amalgamated with Connell & Moodie, to form the Perpetual Trustees and Agency Company, which Robert chaired. The Perpetual Trustees Estate and Agency Co Ltd continues, after further mergers, as Perpetual Guardian. Robert was a director of Dunedin Waterworks Company and chairman of Westport Coal Company. He was a founder of the Presbyterian Knox Church, president of its Young Men's Association, started its library, local Treasurer of the London Missionary Society and a founder of the Otago Institute. Robert took part in observations of the Transit of Venus, naming his house, Transit House.

References

1835 births
1886 deaths
19th-century New Zealand politicians
Hill-McIndoe-Gillies family
Members of the New Zealand House of Representatives
New Zealand MPs for South Island electorates
Burials at Dunedin Northern Cemetery
People from the Isle of Bute